Marcel Pourbaix (16 September 1904 – 28 September 1998) was a Belgian chemist and pianist. He performed his most well known research at the University of Brussels, studying corrosion.  His biggest achievement is the derivation of potential-pH, better known as “Pourbaix Diagrams”.  Pourbaix Diagrams are thermodynamic charts constructed using the Nernst equation and visualize the relationship between possible phases of a system, bounded by lines representing the reactions that transport between them.  They can be read much like a phase diagram.

In 1963, Pourbaix produced "Atlas of Electrochemical Equilibria", which contains potential-pH diagrams for all elements known at the time.  Pourbaix and his collaborators began preparing the work in the early 1950s.

Early life

He was born in Myshega (Aleksin District, Tula Governorate, Russian Empire), where his father was a consultant on an engineering project.  He studied in Brussels and graduated from the Faculty of Applied Sciences of the Université Libre de Bruxelles in 1927.

By 1938, he had devised the potential-pH diagrams. In 1939, just before the outbreak of World War II, he presented to the Faculty his doctoral dissertation, accompanied by a thesis entitled "Thermodynamics of Dilute Aqueous Solutions. Graphical Representation of the Role of pH and Potential." The war and some confusion among the jury on the sign of electrode potential impeded the completion of his graduation process. However, the thesis was presented to the Technical University Delft.

Career

During the fifties and early sixties, Marcel Pourbaix and his collaborators produced potential-pH diagrams for all the elements and published the "Atlas of Electrochemical Equilibria" in French in 1963 and in English in 1966. As early as in 1962, he introduced the concept of a protection potential against the propagation of localized corrosion, which he developed in 1963, in relation with the peculiar electrochemical conditions in occluded electrochemical cells. Pourbaix' doctoral thesis had a major influence on corrosion science. Ulick R. Evans found this work important and arranged for an English translation, published by Arnold (London) in 1949. In 1949, he was one of the founders of CITCE (Comite International de Thermodynamique et Cinetique Electrochimiques) together with 13 other electrochemists: C.Boute, J.Gillis, A. Julliard (Belgium), P. Delahay, P.Van Rysselberghe (USA), J.O'M.Bockris, T.P.Hoar (UK), G.Charlot, G.Valensi (France), R.Piontelli (Italy), G.Burgers (The Netherlands) and J.Heyrovsky (Czechoslovakia). CITCE was a success. In 1971 the name was changed to International Society of Electrochemistry (ISE). The current membership is over 1100 with members from 59 countries. In 1951 he founded CEBELCOR, which became one of the world's first centres dedicated to the theoretical and experimental study of corrosion phenomena. In 1952 Pourbaix founded the Commission of Electrochemistry of the International Union of Pure and Applied Chemistry (IUPAC) and that Commission clarified in 1953 the chaotic state of affairs then prevailing in the signs of electrode potentials.

He was an international collaborator in combating corrosion, visiting and lecturing widely during his career. He contributed actively to the creation of an International Corrosion Council (ICC) with the aim of encouraging research and international cooperation in corrosion science and engineering and friendship among scientists and engineers. In 1990, The National Association of Corrosion Engineers (NACE) created a "Marcel Pourbaix Award Student Fellowship" and the ICC created in 1996 a "Marcel Pourbaix Award for International Cooperation." He was a published author of various papers in addition to his atlas.

Pourbaix worked on the "Atlas of Chemical and Electrochemical Equilibria in the Presence of a Gas Phase," a work that covers an even wider field than the Atlas in aqueous solutions. Marcel Pourbaix was founder, honorary director and scientific adviser of CEBELCOR (Belgian Center for Corrosion Study), Professor at the Universite Libre de Bruxelles, co-founder of CITCE, former chairman of the Commission of Electrochemistry of IUPAC (1952), of ICC (1969), member of the Advisory Committee of Electrochimica Acta (1959-1972) and of the Executive Board of Corrosion Science.

See also
 Corrosion engineering
 Electrochemistry
 Michael Faraday
 Mars Guy Fontana
 Herbert H. Uhlig
 Ulick Richardson Evans
 Melvin Romanoff

References

 Pourbaix, M., Atlas of electrochemical equilibria in aqueous solutions. 2d English ed. 1974, Houston, Tex.: National Association of Corrosion Engineers.

External links 
Marcel Pourbaix (1904–1998)

Belgian chemists
1904 births
1998 deaths
Belgian expatriates in the Russian Empire